The Mrs. Lydia Johnson House is a historic residence located in Maquoketa, Iowa, United States.  This house is a fine example of Queen Anne style architecture in the United States. It was built during the economic boom years in the city's development.  Built in 1895, the two and one half storey house features a complex irregular composition, a corner tower, wrap-around porch, a small porch on the second floor above the main porch, various window shapes and sizes, and textured wall surfaces on the exterior.  Little is known about the Johnson family who built it, but its notability is derived from the architecture.  The house was listed on the National Register of Historic Places in 1991.

References

Houses completed in 1895
Queen Anne architecture in Iowa
Houses in Maquoketa, Iowa
National Register of Historic Places in Jackson County, Iowa
Houses on the National Register of Historic Places in Iowa